Alec Ingold (born July 9, 1996) is an American football fullback for the Miami Dolphins of the National Football League (NFL). He played college football at Wisconsin.

High school career
Originally, Ingold committed to Northern Illinois to play quarterback, but later accepted a scholarship from Wisconsin as an undecided athlete. He was named the Associated Press Wisconsin Player of the Year and the Gatorade Wisconsin Player of the Year his senior year at Bay Port High School as a dual-threat quarterback.

College career
Over his career at Wisconsin, Ingold started eleven games, primarily at fullback his senior year. He was originally a linebacker before moving to running back due to an injury to Corey Clement and later moving to fullback before his sophomore season, spending two years splitting snaps with Austin Ramesh before taking over primary duties his senior season. Ingold was primarily used in short-yardage situations such as goal line scenarios, scoring a high touchdown-to-carry ratio.

After his senior season, Ingold was invited to the 2019 Senior Bowl. He was also the only true fullback invited to the 2019 NFL Scouting Combine. His combine numbers included a 4.89-second 40-yard dash, 16 bench press repetitions, a 34-inch vertical jump and a 116-inch broad jump.

Professional career

Oakland / Las Vegas Raiders
Ingold signed with the Oakland Raiders as an undrafted free agent on May 3, 2019. Ingold made his first start for the Raiders on Monday Night Football against the Denver Broncos on September 9. Ingold scored his first career touchdown on Week 10, in a 26-24 victory of the Los Angeles Chargers. He caught three passes for 22 yards in a 20-16 loss to the Jacksonville Jaguars in Week 15.

On September 21, 2020. on Monday Night Football against the New Orleans Saints, Ingold caught the first Raiders touchdown in Allegiant Stadium history in the 34–24 victory.
In 2020, Ingold was the Las Vegas Raiders nominee for the Walter Payton Man of the Year Award.

In Week 10 of the 2021 season, Ingold suffered a torn ACL and was ruled out for the season.

Miami Dolphins
On March 17, 2022, Ingold signed a two-year, $6.5 million contract with the Miami Dolphins.

Career NFL statistics

|-
| style="text-align:center;"|2019
| style="text-align:center;"|OAK
| 16 || 4 || 10 || 17 || 1.7 || 1.1 || 0 || 6 || 6 || 44 || 7.3 || 2.8 || 1 || 0
|-
| style="text-align:center;"|2020
| style="text-align:center;"|LV
| 16 || 4 || 3 || 4 || 1.3 || 0.3 || 0 || 17 || 12 || 110 || 9.2 || 6.9 || 1 || 0 
|-
| style="text-align:center;"|2021
| style="text-align:center;"|LV
| 9 || 3 || 2 || 1 || 0.5 || 0.1 || 0 || 12 || 10 || 85 || 8.5 || 9.4 || 1 || 0
|-
| style="text-align:center;"|2022
| style="text-align:center;"|MIA
| 17 || 14 || 6 || 8 || 1.3 || 0.5 || 1 || 23 || 15 || 105 || 7.0 || 6.2 || 1 || 0
|- class="sortbottom"
| style="text-align:center;" colspan="2"|Career
| 58 || 25 || 21 || 30 || 1.4 || 0.5 || 1 || 58 || 43 || 344 || 8.0 || 5.9 || 4 || 0
|}

Personal life
Ingold was adopted, and now helps to promote various organizations that raise awareness and help the adoption of children.  He was childhood friends with fellow Bay Port alum Dan Buenning, the first BPHS football player to be drafted into the NFL. During his time at Bay Port, Ingold was also a state champion wrestler, winning the 220-pound weight class in Division 1 as a senior.

Before his rookie NFL season, Ingold secured an internship at Oracle Corporation in the event that he did not make a final NFL roster.

References

External links
 Miami Dolphins bio
 Wisconsin Badgers bio

Living people
American football fullbacks
Players of American football from Wisconsin
Sportspeople from Green Bay, Wisconsin
Wisconsin Badgers football players
Las Vegas Raiders players
Oakland Raiders players
1996 births
Miami Dolphins players
African American adoptees
Ed Block Courage Award recipients